Nawaf Al-Sadi (born 21 October 2000) is a Saudi Arabian professional footballer who plays as a midfielder for Pro League side Abha.

Career
Al-Sadi started his career at the youth teams of hometown club Al-Shaheed. He joined Abha on 26 January 2020. He was called up to the first team on 15 April 2021 in the league match against Al-Ain. He made his first-team debut on 12 August 2021 in the 6–1 defeat to Al-Ittihad. On 31 August 2022, Al-Sadi renewed his contract with Abha. On 16 December 2022, Al-Sadi made his first start for the club and first appearance in the 2022–23 season in the league match against Al-Tai. On 25 December 2022, Al-Sadi scored his first goal for the club in a 2–0 win against Al-Adalah. On 2 January 2023, Al-Sadi was awarded the Young Player of the Month award for his impressive performances in the month of December.

References

External links
 
 

Living people
2000 births
Association football midfielders
Saudi Arabian footballers
Muhayil Club players
Abha Club players
Saudi Professional League players